Clivina tranquebarica is a species of ground beetle in the subfamily Scaritinae. It was described by Bonelli in 1813.

References

tranquebarica
Beetles described in 1813